Wilson Lalín (born 3 May 1985) is a Guatemalan professional  footballer.

International career
He was called up to the Guatemala team for the 2015 CONCACAF Gold Cup; he played in Guatemala's opening game.

International goals
Scores and results list Guatemala's goal tally first.

References

External links
 

1985 births
Living people
Guatemalan footballers
Guatemala international footballers
2009 UNCAF Nations Cup players
2014 Copa Centroamericana players
2015 CONCACAF Gold Cup players
Comunicaciones F.C. players
Deportivo Marquense players
C.D. Suchitepéquez players
Deportivo Sanarate F.C. players
C.D. Malacateco players
Liga Nacional de Fútbol de Guatemala players
Association football defenders